The Ministry of Transport, abbreviated MOT, is a ministry of the Government of Malaysia that is responsible for transport: road transport, civil aviation, marine, road safety, port authority, railway assets, maritime, air accident investigation, logistic, maritime safety, shipping, rail transport, airport, airline.

The Minister of Transport administers his functions through the Ministry of Transport and a range of other government agencies.
Its headquarters is in Putrajaya.

Organisation
 Minister of Transport
 Under the Authority of Minister
 Air Accident Investigation Bureau
 Deputy Minister
 Secretary-General
 Under the Authority of Secretary-General
 Internal Audit Unit
 Legal Advisor Office
 Corporation Communication Unit
 Integrity Unit
 Key Performance Indicator Unit
 Deputy Secretary-General (Policy)
 Strategic Planning and International Division
 Maritime Division
 Aviation Division
 Logistic and Land Transport Division
 Deputy Secretary-General (Management)
 Human Resource Management Division
 Administration and Finance Division
 Development Division
 Account Division
 Information Management Division

Federal departments
 Road Transport Department Malaysia, or Jabatan Pengangkutan Jalan Malaysia (JPJ). (Official site)
 Civil Aviation Authority Malaysia (CAAM), or Pihak Berkuasa Penerbangan Awam Malaysia. (Official site)
 Marine Department Malaysia, or Jabatan Laut Malaysia (JLM). (Official site)
 Road Safety Department of Malaysia (RSDM), or Jabatan Keselamatan Jalan Raya Malaysia (JKJR). (Official site)
 Sabah Commercial Vehicle Licensing Board (CVLB), or Lembaga Pelesenan Kenderaan Perdagangan Sabah (LPKP Sabah). (Official site)
 Sarawak Commercial Vehicle Licensing Board (CVLD), or Lembaga Pelesenan Kenderaan Perdagangan Sarawak  (LPKP Sarawak). (Official site)

Federal agencies
 Maritime Institute of Malaysia (MIMA), or Institut Maritim Malaysia. (Official Site )
 Malaysian Institute of Road Safety Research (MIROS), or Institut Penyelidikan Keselamatan Jalan Raya Malaysia. (Official Site)
 Penang Port Commission (PPC), or Suruhanjaya Pelabuhan Pulau Pinang (SPPP). (Official Site)
 Port Klang Authority (PKA), or Lembaga Pelabuhan Klang (LPK). (Official Site)
 Johor Port Authority, or Lembaga Pelabuhan Johor (LPJ). (Official Site)
 Bintulu Port Authority (BPA), or Lembaga Pelabuhan Bintulu. (Official site)
 Kuantan Port Authority, or Lembaga Pelabuhan Kuantan (LPKtn). (Official site)
 Railway Assets Corporation (RAC), or Perbadanan Aset Keretapi. (Official site)

Key legislation
The Ministry of Transport is responsible for administration of several key Acts:
Air Transportation
 Civil Aviation Act 1969 [Act 3]
 Carriage by Air Act 1974 [Act 148]
 Aviation Offences Act 1984 [Act 307]
 Airport and Aviation Services (Operating Company) Act 1991 [Act 467]
 International Interests in Mobile Equipment (Aircraft) Act 2006 [Act 659]
Road Transport
 Road Transport Act 1987 [Act 333]
 Commercial Vehicles Licensing Board Act 1987 [Act 334]
 Malaysian Institute of Road Safety Research Act 2012 [Act 748]
Rail Transport
 Railways Act 1991[Act 463]
 Railways (Successor Company) Act 1991 [Act 464]
Maritime Transport
 Penang Port Commission Act 1955 [Act 140]
 Bintulu Port Authority Act 1981 [Act 243]
 Federation Light Dues Act 1953 [Act 250]
 Ports (Privatization) Act 1990 [Act 422]
 Port Authorities Act 1963 [Act 488]
 Merchant Shipping (Oil Pollution) Act 1994 [Act 515]
 Carriage of Goods by Sea Act 1950 [Act 527]
 Langkawi International Yacht Registry Act 2003 [Act 630]

Functions
 To plan, formulate and implement policies for maritime transport, rail, ports and civil aviation.
 Infrastructure projects, rail, maritime, ports and civil aviation.
 Coordinate the integration between transport modes to achieve seamless travel.
 Provides licensing services:
 License/permit the operation of the service provider and the holder of the concession (except commercial vehicle road).
 Individual licence-private/commercial vehicle drivers, pilot and others.
 Domestic shipping licence.
 Registration of all modes of vehicles.
 Determine pricing policy (except commercial vehicle road).
 Regulate the policies and operations of the concessionaire/government companies.
 Verification/monitoring service standards, security (service and safety standards) and legislation.
 Implementing regional and international co-operation in the field of transport.

Mission
Ensure that the various transport systems that are efficient, sustainable, integrated, secure, and user-friendly.

Motto
Sustainable transport heart of national transformation.

Objective
 The provision of integrated transport infrastructure network-based supply driven.
 Preparation of high-tech transportation system, modern and efficient.
 The provision of public transport services and goods that seamless, and secure.
 Preparation of environment competitive transportation industry.
 Provision of effective regulation and enforcement and integrity.

See also

 Minister of Transport (Malaysia)

References

External links
 Ministry of Transport
 Ministry of Transport 
 

 
Federal ministries, departments and agencies of Malaysia
Ministries established in 1978
1978 establishments in Malaysia
Malaysia
Organizations investigating aviation accidents and incidents